Sierra de La Ventana is a village in Tornquist Partido in the southwest of the Province of Buenos Aires, Argentina. With a population of 1,819 inhabitants, it is one of the most attractive tourist centres in the Province and has numerous recreation areas and parks.

The town, originally called Villa Tívoli Argentina, was founded on 17 January 1908 by Diedrich Meyer and developed around the railway station. It was later renamed Sierra de La Ventana after the nearby 1,186 m rocky peak La Ventana, part of the Sierra de la Ventana mountains,  which has a natural rock formation containing an opening or 'window' 9 m wide and 11 m high. In 1959 the peak was declared a Natural Monument.

A large, luxurious hotel resort, Club Hotel de la Ventana, was opened in 1911 near Villa Ventana, 17 km from the town.  For a brief period, it attracted the rich and famous but soon suffered from the effects of World War I in Europe and closed in 1920.  Between 1940 and 1946 it was used to intern some of the crew of the German pocket battleship Admiral Graf Spee after it was scuttled outside the harbour of Montevideo, Uruguay, by its captain, Hans Langsdorff, at the end of the Battle of the River Plate.

References 

 PostalSerrana | Host in Sierra de la Ventana & Villa Ventana
 Sierra de la Ventana portal
 Tourist website
 Sierra de La Ventana blog

Populated places in Buenos Aires Province
Populated places established in 1908
Tourist attractions in Buenos Aires Province
1908 establishments in Argentina